Princeton Tigers ice hockey may refer to either of the ice hockey teams that represent Princeton University:

Princeton Tigers men's ice hockey
Princeton Tigers women's ice hockey